Prison Break is a 1938 American crime-drama film directed by Arthur Lubin and starring Barton MacLane, Glenda Farrell and Paul Hurst.

The film was based on the story "Walls of San Quentin" by Norton S. Parker. It was released by Universal Pictures on July 12, 1938. A fisherman confesses to a murder he didn't commit to protect a friend. Determined to keep out of trouble in prison, but another convict makes things difficult for him.

Plot
Joaquin Shannon (Barton MacLane), a fisherman, takes the blame for a crime to protect his brother-in-law Joe Fenderson (Edward Pawley), who died from injuries from a mugging. He is sentenced to 10 years in prison for the crime. Joaquin asks Joe's sister and his girlfriend Jean Fenderson (Glenda Farrell) to wait for him, expecting to be paroled in one year for good behavior. However, in prison, he battles with Red Kincaid (Ward Bond). Joaquin's repeat altercation with Red causes him to fail his parole examination and his prison sentences are lengthened. Later, when Joaquin helps to stop a prison break which was led by Red, he is immediately released from prison.

Joaquin reunites with Jean. However, because of his criminal record and prison sentence, he is shunned and dismissed by employers. In a bar, he meets Soapy (Paul Hurst) a fellow ex-convict. Soapy convinces Joaquin to smuggle someone out of the country, who is actually Red and has escaped from prison. When Red and Soapy show up at the boat, they force Joaquin to navigate the boat. A dying Soapy who was shot by the police tells Jean that Red killed her brother. After finding out the truth, Joaquin fights Red and knocks him out so he can be delivered to the police, hopeful his name will be cleared in the process.

Cast
 Barton MacLane as Joaquin Shannon
 Glenda Farrell as Jean
 Paul Hurst as Soapy
 Constance Moore as Maria Shannon
 Edward Pawley as Joe Fenderson
 Edmund MacDonald as Chris
 Ward Bond as Red Kincaid
 Guy Usher as The Warden
 Victor Kilian as Fenderson
 Frank Darian as Cappy
 George Cleveland as Ding
 John Russell as Jackie 
 Thomas Louden as Priest
 Paul Everton as Judge

Production
Glenda Farrell and Barton MacLane became popular co-starring in the Warner Bros.' Torchy Blane film series. The movie, Prison Break, were supposed to be the first film in a four-picture deal and dual contract with Farrell and MacLane. However, they made no other films at the Universal Pictures again with each other. Arthur Lubin became attached to direct on 12 April with Trem Carr with whom he had made several movies to produce. He supervised the writing of the script at Victorville.

The movie's working titles were "State Prison", "Prison Walls" and "Walls of San Quentin".

Filming started 16 May 1938 under the title Walls of San Quentin. Later in May the title was changed to State Prison as it was felt "San Quentin" had already been used in a title for a film with MacLane. The title would be changed again.

Reception
Frank S. Nugent of The New York Times writes:
Unlike most of our modestly-budgeted melodramas dealing with the parole system, "Prison Break"... omits the jubilant finale in which the boss-racketeer controlling the parole board is exposed and the warden-in-cahoots is sent further up the river. In point of stricter fact, Universal's little treatise has omitted both the racketeer and the corrupt warden, and adheres throughout to its pessimistic view of parole. Although we hesitate to damn a film producer, in these cautious days, with the epithet "crusader," we really distrust Universal of having expressed an opinion. Is there a picket in the audience? The trouble with prisons, the picture says, is that they're full of such unpleasant people. When you take an honest, non-criminal soul like Barton MacLane's tuna fisherman, Joaquin Shannon, and pen him up with hardened offenders of the Red Kincaid type you are either going to have him turn criminal himself or get a bad name with the keepers for punching Mr. Bond in the jaw. Then there are a few notorious inconsistencies about parole itself: the denial of the right to marry, which deprives Mr. MacLane of the benefits of Glenda Farrell's society; and the stern rule about letting even a paroled tuna fisherman go beyond the jurisdictional 12-mile limit. Mr. MacLane really exercises more restraint than we would expect any one of so Irish a face to show, but he does lose his temper at last, just before the scriptwriters relent and decide to clear up the mystery of the murdered Joe Fenderson. By that time you probably will be as confused about it as we were — not knowing whether to relax and take it as just another moderately good Class B melodrama, or to muster your indignation over the seemingly iniquitous parole system. In either case, it's not a bad show at all."
The Los Angeles Times said the film had  "originality" and "marked dramatic interest".

Diabolique magazine called it "a Warner Bros-style innocent-man-accused-of-crime-goes-to-prison tale... like most of Lubin’s movies from this time it is stacked to the brim with plot, and the director punches it through."

Home media
Prison Break was released on DVD on May 14, 2007.

References

External links

Prison Break at TCMDB
Prison Break at Letterbox DVD
Prison Break at BFI

1938 crime drama films
1938 films
American crime drama films
American black-and-white films
1930s English-language films
Films based on short fiction
Films set in prison
1930s prison films
Universal Pictures films
Films directed by Arthur Lubin
American prison drama films
1930s American films